Universidad Privada San Juan Bautista is a private university in the city of Lima, Peru. It offers 16 career programs categorized in 4 schools.

References

Universities in Lima